A military unit cover designator (MUCD) is a unique five-digit number used by the People's Liberation Army of the People's Republic of China to externally identify military units. MUCDs are used externally to protect the identity of units, while a true unit designator (TUD) is used internally as they plainly identify the unit and its function.

An example, a bomber regiment in the People's Liberation Army Air Force (PLAAF) 8th Air Division may be known by its TUD, '22nd Air Regiment', or by its MUCD, 'Unit 95183'. The unit's TUD is used by members of the regiment, in common discourse, and among defense analysts, while the MUCD is used on stationery letterheads, newspapers, banners, magazine articles, and signs at the entrance to military facilities.

Some units, namely those conducting sensitive and secretive operations like those of the Third Department (Operations) of the Joint Staff Department, may only be known by their MUCD as their TUD has not been discovered. Popular examples include Unit 61398 and Unit 61486.

History 
First seeing use in the early 1950s, the MUCD system has been changed at least five times since the early 1950s with the most recent change in 2016.

Begun shortly after the 1949 communist victory in the Chinese Civil War, MUCDs were originally four-digit numbers until 1975 when, as part of Deng Xiaoping's counter-Maoist military reforms, the five-digit system presently used was introduced. Changing under further military reforms in 1987, the PLA saw the reconsolidation of eleven military regions down to seven. MUCD's changed again in 2000 and once more in 2016 following the PLA's massive reorganization under Xi Jinping that included the transition from military regions to theater commands, the Second Artillery Corps to the People's Liberation Army Rocket Force (PLARF), and the establishment of the Strategic Support Force (PLASSF) which incorporated various functional units of the General Staff Department (which became the Joint Staff Department).

Blocks 
While blocks of MUCDs are apportioned to commands, those commands decide how MUCDs are internally assigned without regulation from the Central Military Commission leading to variance in numbering patterns below the command.

See also 

 Unit Identification Code (UIC), United States
 Military Unit Number, USSR and post-Soviet states
 Tsūshōgō, Imperial Japanese Army

References 

Military of China
People's Liberation Army